The 2011–12 Bulgarian Cup was the 30th official season of the Bulgarian annual football knockout tournament. The competition began in September 2011 with the matches of the preliminary round and ended with the final in May 2012. CSKA Sofia were the defending champions, but lost to Septemvri Simitli in the quarterfinals. Ludogorets Razgrad won the title, after defeating Lokomotiv Plovdiv in the final.

The winners of the competition, Ludogorets, won also the championship and thus the Bulgarian cup runner-up, Lokomotiv Plovdiv, qualified for the second qualifying round of the 2012–13 UEFA Europa League.

Participating clubs
The following teams competed in the cup:

†: Teams from the North-East zone declined participation

Calendar for remaining rounds
The calendar for the remaining rounds of the 2010–11 Bulgarian Cup, as announced by the BFL.
 Round 1: 20 October 2011
 Round 2: 23 November 2011
 Round 3: 3 December 2011
 Quarter-finals:  Spring 2012
 Semi-finals: Spring 2012
 Final: May 2012

First round 
The draw was conducted on 12 October 2011. The matches will be played on 20 October 2011 and one match on 19 October 2011. On this stage the participants will be the 20 teams from the two groups of B PFG (second division) and the 9 winners from the regional amateur competitions. The team from the lower league had home advantage.

Because the teams from North-East zone canceled their participation, three teams will receive a bye for the next round. According to the draw those teams are FC Bansko (Bansko) (II), FC Vereya (Stara Zagora) (IV) and FC Slivnishki Geroi (Slivnitsa) (II).

Note: Roman numerals in brackets denote the league tier the clubs participate in during the 2011–12 season.

Second round 
The draw was conducted on 3 November 2011. The matches will be played on 23 November 2011. On this stage the participants will be the 16 winners from the first round and the 16 teams from A PFG (first division). The team from the lower league has home advantage.

Note: Roman numerals in brackets denote the league tier the clubs participate in during the 2011–12 season.

Third round 
The draw will be conducted on 25 November 2011. The matches will be played on 3 December 2011. On this stage the participants will be the 16 winners from the second round. The team from the lower league has home advantage.

Note: Roman numerals in brackets denote the league tier the clubs participate in during the 2011–12 season.

Quarter-finals 
The matches will be played on 14 March 2012. On this stage the participants will be the 8 winners from the third round. The team from the lower league has home advantage.

Note: Roman numerals in brackets denote the league tier the clubs participate in during the 2011–12 season.

Semi-finals 
The matches will be played on 11 April 2012. at this stage the participants will be the 4 winners from the quarter finals. The team from the lower league has home advantage.

Note: Roman numerals in brackets denote the league tier the clubs participate in during the 2011–12 season.

Final

See also
 2011–12 A Group
 2011–12 B Group
 2011–12 V AFG

References

Bulgarian Cup seasons
Bulgarian Cup
Cup